Scott Glennie (born February 22, 1991) is a Canadian former professional ice hockey forward. Glennie was drafted in the first round, 8th overall, by the Dallas Stars in the 2009 National Hockey League (NHL) Entry Draft. However, he would end up playing just one single game at the NHL level in six professional seasons.  Prior to turning professional, Glennie played for the Brandon Wheat Kings of the Western Hockey League.

Playing career

Amateur
Glennie was drafted by the Brandon Wheat Kings in the second round, 29th overall in the 2006 Western Hockey League (WHL) Bantam Draft.  He played his last season of minor hockey with the Winnipeg Wild of the Manitoba Midget Hockey League. In his rookie season with the team in 2007–08, Glennie had the third highest goal total on the club, scoring 26 goals, while finishing with the fifth highest point total at 58. In the playoffs, Glennie scored one goal in six games as Brandon was eliminated in the first round of the playoffs.  In his second year in Brandon, Glennie would miss fifteen games due to injuries, however, he would improve his numbers from his rookie season, as Glennie scored 28 goals and 70 points, once again finishing fifth in team scoring. Glennie would have an impressive playoff performance, tying Brayden Schenn in team scoring with 18 points in 12 post-season games.  Glennie was a highly ranked prospect heading into the 2009 NHL Entry Draft, ending up ranked 7th among all North American skaters by the NHL's Central Scouting Bureau.  He was drafted in the first round, 8th overall by the Dallas Stars.

Professional
On July 13, 2010, Glennie was signed to a three-year entry-level contract with the Stars.  After his season with Brandon was over, Glennie joined the Texas Stars of the American Hockey League (AHL) for the final few games and playoffs of the 2010–11 AHL season, playing in four games and recording no points.  Glennie made his National Hockey League (NHL) debut during the 2011–12 season with the Dallas Stars.  He played in a single game, without recording any points.  With the exception of his one game at the NHL level, Glennie had spent his entire professional career with the Texas Stars until the end of the 2014–15 season. During the 2013-14 AHL season, Glennie scored a career-high 15 goals and 28 points in the regular season, along with 10 points (six goals, four assists) in the postseason en route to the Stars' Calder Cup Championship run. This led to a one-year contract renewal.

At the conclusion of the 2014–15 season and only having played one regular season game with Dallas, the Stars announced they would not renew his contract.

After sitting out the entirety of the 2015–16 season as a free agent in order to fully recuperate from injury, Glennie accepted an invite to try out with hometown club, the Manitoba Moose on September 21, 2016. After a successful training camp with the Moose, Glennie resumed his professional career in signing a one-year deal on October 14, 2016.

Personal life
Glennie learned how to skate when he was three years old, and began playing organized hockey when he was four.  Growing up, his hockey hero was Mario Lemieux.  During the off-season prior to the 2013–14 season, Glennie spent time training with former Stars Brent Severyn and Ulf Dahlen to improve his chances of playing at the NHL level. In 2022-23 he coached HC Edmonton in the JPHL to second in the Alberta division

Career statistics

Regular season and playoffs

International

Awards and honours

References

External links

Scott Glennie player profile on the Western Hockey League site

1991 births
Living people
Brandon Wheat Kings players
Canadian ice hockey centres
Dallas Stars draft picks
Dallas Stars players
Manitoba Moose players
National Hockey League first-round draft picks
Ice hockey people from Winnipeg
Texas Stars players